The Marshal of the Senate of the Republic of Poland is the presiding officer of the Senate of Poland. The marshal is also third person according to the Polish order of precedence, after President of the Republic of Poland and Sejm Marshal, and second in line to become Acting President of the Republic of Poland (after Sejm Marshal; in period 1935-1939 Senate Marshal was the first). Because of both precedence order and succession order, the marshal is commonly referred to as the "third person in state". The person who functions as their second-in-command is the Deputy Marshal of the Senate of the Republic of Poland.

Role
Marshal:
 Represent Senate
 Preside over Senate sessions
 Preside over Senate Presidium and caucus of heads of Senatorial caucuses (Konwent Seniorów) meetings
 Performing some representative roles on the state level
 Becoming Acting President when Sejm Marshal cannot do so
 Is in charge on peacekeeping in the Senate

History
Marshals of the Senate existed as early as the Duchy of Warsaw (19th century). In the Polish–Lithuanian Commonwealth, the role was performed by the Grand Crown Marshals.

List of officeholders

Second Republic 
In Second Polish Republic:

The office was interrupted by German invasion of Poland in 1939 and not reinstated in People's Republic of Poland.

Third Republic 
In modern Poland:

See also
 Sejm Marshal

Senate of Poland
Poland, Senate